The Fosters is a British television programme, produced by London Weekend Television, which aired on ITV from 9 April 1976 until 9 July 1977.

It was created and developed by Jon Watkins, who adapted the American sitcom Good Times created by Eric Monte and Mike Evans, and developed by Norman Lear.  It was one of the first British television programmes to have an entirely black cast, and was a predecessor to future series such as The Real McCoy, No Problem!, Desmond's and The Lenny Henry Show (and its subsequent incarnations).

Overview
The series starred Norman Beaton as Samuel Foster, a hard-working man trying to support his family in a South London council flat. The character of Samuel was based on James Evans Sr. (portrayed by John Amos) in Good Times. Alongside Beaton was Isabelle Lucas, portraying Samuel's wife, Pearl Foster (based on Florida Evans in Good Times, portrayed by Esther Rolle), who gossips with her best friend, Vilma, played by Carmen Munroe and based on Willona Woods (portrayed by Ja'Net DuBois) from the US series.  Munroe and Beaton would later star in Desmond's as married couple Shirley and Desmond Ambrose.

Included in the show's cast was teenager Lenny Henry, in his first regular TV role, playing Sonny Foster, Pearl and Samuel's eldest child, a painter. J.J. Evans (portrayed by Jimmie Walker) was the American equivalent.

Sharon Rosita played Sonny's younger sister, Shirley Foster (Thelma Evans, portrayed by Bern Nadette Stanis, in the US version), the couple's only daughter, and their second-oldest child. Samuel and Pearl's younger son, Benjamin, was played by Lawrie Mark. In the American series, Michael Evans (portrayed by Ralph Carter) was Benjamin's counterpart.

Episodes (and their titles) of The Fosters were derived from scripts from those of Good Times episodes. Overall, two series and a total of 27 episodes were produced, with the final episode broadcast on 9 July 1977.

Cast
 Norman Beaton as Samuel Foster
 Isabelle Lucas as Pearl Foster
 Carmen Munroe as Vilma
 Lenny Henry as Sonny Foster
 Sharon Rosita as Shirley Foster
 Lawrie Mark as Benjamin Foster

Episodes

DVD release

External links
 

1976 British television series debuts
1977 British television series endings
1970s British sitcoms
Black British sitcoms
Black British television shows
British television series based on American television series
Television series by ITV Studios
London Weekend Television shows
ITV sitcoms
English-language television shows
Television shows set in London